Terminal Earth is the second full-length album by the German speed metal band Scanner. It was released in 1989 by Noise Records.

Track listing 
"The Law" – 4:17
"Not Alone" – 3:52
"Wonder" – 4:07
"Buy or Die" – 4:59
"Telemania" – 4:36
"Touch the Light" – 5:02
"Terminal Earth" – 3:51
"From the Dust of Ages" – 9:25
"The Challenge" – 4:35
"L.A.D.Y." – 4:35

Credits 
S.L. Coe – vocals
Axel Julius – guitars
Tom Sopha – guitars
Martin Bork – bass
Wolfgang Kolorz – drums

References 

1989 albums
Scanner (band) albums
Noise Records albums